Britney Spears Live from Las Vegas is the fourth video album by American recording artist Britney Spears. It was released on January 22, 2002 through Jive Records. Recorded during Spears' concert during the Dream Within a Dream Tour (2001–02) at the MGM Grand Garden Arena in Las Vegas, originally broadcast on HBO, Spears performed sixteen songs inbetween dance routines and costume changes.

Synopsis
On November 17 and 18, 2001, Spears brought her Dream Within a Dream Tour to the MGM Grand Garden Arena in Las Vegas, Nevada. The 18th performance was broadcast live on HBO, and later released on DVD, entitled Britney Spears Live from Las Vegas, on January 22, 2002, containing footage from both concerts. During the concert, Spears is seen doing from bungee jumping to playing a jewellery box ballerina, from running through a row of fire trees to "singing in the rain". She is also seen posing as a Janis Joplin wannabe in a comedy take-off of a "Making the Band" documentary.

Britney Spears Live from Las Vegas showcases 16 of Spears's biggest hits from her three multi-platinum albums, ...Baby One More Time (1999), Oops!... I Did It Again (2000) and her then latest release, Britney (2001). The concert is full of effects and costume changes.

Critical reception
Britney Spears Live from Las Vegas received positive reviews from music critics. Jeremy Conrad from IGN Music praised the audio and video quality, and gave the film grade of six out of ten, stating it's "only scoring above average".

Commercial performance
Britney Spears Live from Las Vegas was a commercial success. It peaked atop the US Top Music Videos on March 2, 2002. Internationally, it topped the video charts in Australia and Mexico. It was certified double platinum by the Recording Industry Association of America (RIAA), denoting shipments of over 200,000 copies, as well as receiving platinum and gold certifications in Australia and Mexico, respectively.

Track listing

Notes
 Subtitles available in English, Spanish, French, German and Japanese.

Accolades

Charts

Certifications

References

Britney Spears video albums
2002 live albums
2002 video albums
Jive Records live albums
Jive Records video albums
Live video albums
Britney Spears live albums
Albums recorded at the MGM Grand Las Vegas
Television shows directed by Marty Callner
Concert films